The Fieseler F 6 was a two-seat trainer and sport aircraft developed, built, and flown at the Fieseler Aircraft Works in Kassel.

History
The Fieseler F 6 was a changed version of the Fieseler F 5. It changed the shape of the wing in the hull and tail. In the company's development report, and in a German newspaper, the machine was mentioned without details or technical data. Through a photo, it is verified that it was approved at least and received the production flag D-EBIX.

See also
 List of aircraft

1930s German sport aircraft
F 6
Low-wing aircraft
Single-engined tractor aircraft